George A. Decker (June 1, 1866 – June 7, 1909), was a professional baseball player who played outfielder in the Major Leagues from -. Decker played for the St. Louis Browns, Chicago Colts, Louisville Colonels, and Washington Senators.

In 704 games over eight seasons, Decker posted a .276 batting average (756-for-2739) with 423 runs, 25 home runs, 416 RBI and 112 stolen bases. He finished his career with a .959 fielding percentage playing at every position except pitcher and catcher.

External links

1869 births
1909 deaths
Major League Baseball outfielders
Baseball players from Pennsylvania
Sportspeople from York, Pennsylvania
St. Louis Browns (NL) players
Chicago Colts players
Louisville Colonels players
Washington Senators (1891–1899) players
19th-century baseball players
Joliet Giants players
Joliet Convicts players
St. Paul Apostles players
St. Paul Saints (Western League) players
Los Angeles Angels (minor league) players
Oakland Commuters players
Aspen (minor league baseball) players